The Minister for International Security Strategy was a British government position. The last holder of the post was Andrew Murrison, Conservative Parliamentary Under-Secretary of State at the Ministry of Defence,

The post was a junior ministerial position within the Ministry of Defence. It ceased to exist in 2014.

Minister for International Defence and Security

References

International Defence and Security
International Defence and Security
Defunct ministerial offices in the United Kingdom
2008 establishments in the United Kingdom
2014 disestablishments in the United Kingdom